Hyperion (18 April 1930 – 9 December 1960) was a British-bred Thoroughbred, a dual classic winner and an outstanding sire. Owned by Edward Stanley, 17th Earl of Derby, Hyperion won GBP £29,509 during his racing career—a considerable sum at the time. His victories included the Epsom Derby and St Leger Stakes.  He was the most successful British-bred sire of the 20th century and champion sire in Great Britain six times between 1940 and 1954.

Hyperion was by the good sire Gainsborough, who was one of three wartime Triple Crown winners in Great Britain. His dam, Selene, was by Chaucer, a talented son of the undefeated St. Simon. Selene was also the dam of such good sires as Sickle (GB) (sireline ancestor of Native Dancer and Sea Bird), Pharamond (US), and Hunter's Moon (GB). Hyperion was inbred in the third and fourth generation to St. Simon, and was trained by George Lambton at Newmarket. Hyperion, who stood just 15.1 hands high, was one of the smallest horses to ever win a British Classic, but he had a good action and beautiful temperament.

Racing career

At two years
Hyperion was a good two-year-old winning the New Stakes at Ascot and the Dewhurst Stakes plus a dead-heat in the Prince of Wales Stakes from five starts in 1932.

At three years
He was undefeated in four starts, winning the Chester Vase, the Epsom Derby, the Prince of Wales Stakes and the St Leger Stakes.

At four years
He raced four times also at four years, winning two races, the March Stakes (ten furlongs) and the Burwell Stakes (showcase handicap), both contested at Newmarket. In his main race, the Ascot Gold Cup, he was third to Felicitation and Thor. The two and a half miles indicated that he was not a true stayer. In the Dullingham Stakes at Newmarket, only two horses started where three-year-old, Caithness, carrying 8 st. 1 lb. defeated Hyperion carrying 10 st. 2 lb. by a short head.

Stud record
He was retired to stud when he was five years old and became a phenomenal success.

An important stallion, he sired the winners of 752 races, including 53 stakes winners that had 84 stakes wins, and was the leading sire in Great Britain & Ireland six times, counting amongst his progeny:
 Aureole (GB) H, 1950 — Coronation Cup (1954), King George VI and Queen Elizabeth Stakes (1954)
 Godiva (GB) M, 1937 — 1,000 Guineas (1940), New Oaks Stakes (1940)
 Gulf Stream (GB) H, 1943 — Gimcrack Stakes (1945), Eclipse Stakes (1946)
 Hypericum (GB) M, 1943 — Dewhurst Stakes (1945), 1,000 Guineas (1946)
 Owen Tudor (GB) H, 1938 — Epsom Derby (1941), Ascot Gold Cup (1942)
 Pensive (US) H, 1941 — Kentucky Derby (1944), Preakness Stakes (1944)
 Sun Castle (GB) H, 1938 — St Leger Stakes (1941)
 Sun Chariot (IRE) M, 1939 — 1,000 Guineas (1942), Epsom Oaks (1942), St Leger Stakes (1942)
 Sun Stream (GB) M, 1942 — 1,000 Guineas (1945), Epsom Oaks (1945)
 Heliopolis (GB) H, 1936 — was sold to an American breeder for whom he stood in Kentucky and was the leading sire in North America twice in 1950 and 1954.

Hyperion's daughters foaled the winners of 1,196 races and GBP £1,131,346. He was also the damsire of Nearctic, who in turn sired Northern Dancer, the 20th century's greatest sire. He is also the damsire of Citation, one of the greatest American champions.

In Australia and New Zealand, Hyperion's descendants have exerted a profound influence on the racing and breeding industry. This influence was introduced via Hyperion's foreign based sons and also by his imported sons, Empyrean [(GB) H, 1944], Helios [(GB) H, 1937], High Peak [(GB) H, 1942], Red Mars [(GB) H, 1941], and Ruthless [(GB) H, 1941], as well as paternal grandsons such as "Star King" (by Stardust (GB) H, 1937) later known as the outstanding sire, Star Kingdom.

Lord Derby commissioned equine artist Martin Stainforth to paint a portrait of Hyperion.

A lifesize statue modelled by John Skeaping in bronze of Hyperion stands at the front of the Jockey Club headquarters on Newmarket High Street. From 2009, his skeleton has been exhibited at the National Horseracing Museum (also in Newmarket), lent by the Animal Health Trust to replace the skeleton of Eclipse.

When Hyperion died, Lord Derby and associates toasted him from a bottle of cognac that had been opened in honor of Winston Churchill, and drank to "The two greatest Grand Old Men of our time."

Pedigree

See also
 List of historical horses

References

External links
 Hyperion's story with photos
 Hyperion’s racing career
 Hyperion’s progeny
 Newmarket Journal article on the exhibition of Hyperion's skeleton

1930 racehorse births
1960 racehorse deaths
British Champion Thoroughbred Sires
British Champion Thoroughbred broodmare sires
Epsom Derby winners
Sport horse sires
Racehorses trained in the United Kingdom
Racehorses bred in the United Kingdom
Thoroughbred family 6-e
Chefs-de-Race
St Leger winners